Group races, also known as Pattern races, or Graded races in some jurisdictions, are the highest level of races in Thoroughbred horse racing. They include most of the world's iconic races, such as, in Europe, the Derby, Irish Derby and Prix de l'Arc de Triomphe, in Australia, the Melbourne Cup and in the United States, the Kentucky Derby and Breeders' Cup races. Victory in these races marks a horse as being particularly talented, if not exceptional, and they are extremely important in determining stud values. They are also sometimes referred to as Black type races, since any horse that has won one of these races is printed in bold type in sales catalogues.

By country

Australia

In Australia, the Australian Pattern Committee recommends to the Australian Racing Board (ARB) which races shall be designated as Group races. The list of races approved by the ARB is accepted by the International Cataloguing Standards Committee (ICSC) for publication by The Jockey Club (US) in The Blue Book, thus providing international recognition for Australia's best races.

There are four grades of Group races in Australia:
 Group 1 -  72 races  - minimum prize money A$350,000
 Group 2 - 83 races - minimum prize money A$175,000
 Group 3 - 112 races - minimum prize money A$115,000
 Listed Races - 280 races - minimum prize money A$80,000

Australia has a total of approximately 540 to 550 Group races from a season total of almost 21,000 races. These races were collectively known as Principal Races until about 1979. For a list of Group races see List of Australian Group races.

Europe

In Europe the designation of flat races is agreed by the European Pattern Committee. The Committee grade races into one of three levels, dependent on the average official ratings achieved by the first four finishers in a race over a three-year period.  The breakdown is as follows:
 Group 1 - Minimum official rating of 115 (110 for 2 year olds) - Classics and other races of major international importance
 Group 2 - Minimum official rating of 110 (105 for 2 year olds) - less important international races
 Group 3 - Minimum official rating of 105 (100 for 2 year olds) - primarily domestic races

Like Australia, there is also a grade of races just below "Group" level, known as "Listed races". These have less prestige than the group races but are still more important than handicap races. Listed races also provide their winners and placed horses with "black type" in sales catalogues and their creation was initially left up to each country to regulate. Listed races in Europe are now also regulated by the European Pattern Committee. The current British Horseracing Authority rules state that a race in Great Britain is a Listed race if "in any particular year, it is a flat race which appears as a listed race in the European Pattern Race Book.

The pattern system, overseen by the European Pattern Committee, is fluid and the Group status of key races can change. By this method, the Prince of Wales's Stakes at Royal Ascot was upgraded from Group 2 to Group 1 in the year 2000. However, a number of checks and balances are in place which ensure that changes to the Pattern are gradual and evolutionary, thereby giving the racing industry time to adjust. In particular, the current European Pattern Committee "Ground Rules" explicitly state that no race may be upgraded by more than one Group in any one year. Such restrictions can prove troublesome when major new races are launched. For example, the Dubai World Cup, the world's richest horse race, was only given Listed status for its inaugural running in 1996.

National Hunt racing in Europe has an equivalent grading system where the races are known as Grade 1, Grade 2, Grade 3 and Listed races respectively. This takes place independently of the European Pattern system above, which applies only to flat races.

Hong Kong, China 
There are 31 Group races held in Hong Kong, China.

Group 1:

Group 2 - 7

Group 3 - 12

North America

In North America, the equivalent are known as Graded stakes races.

Unlike in some other countries, handicap races can be included in the North American and Australian grading system; although most graded stakes races in North America and Group races in Australia are conditions races, and handicaps are more often seen in races of lower level, there are still several handicaps that are Grade I or Group 1 races respectively.

Influence on breeding

The pattern system exerts a huge influence on the bloodstock market, particularly in relation to the stud fee that a stallion can command for covering a mare at stud. This will be dictated almost entirely by the stallion's performances in Pattern races during its racing career. Only the very best horses can perform successfully in Group 1 events and such animals invariably command the highest stud fees when their racing career is at an end. A top-quality stallion can be enormously lucrative for its owners – stud fees of more than US$100,000 are relatively commonplace for the most coveted stallions.

See also
 List of Australian Group races
 List of British Group races (flat)
 List of British Group races (jumps)
 List of French Group races (flat)
 List of French Group races (jumps)
 List of German Group races
 List of Irish Group races (flat)
 List of Irish Group races (jumps)
 List of Italian Group races
 List of Italian Group races
 List of Japanese Group races (flat)
 List of Scandinavian Group races
 List of Turkish Group races
List of South African Group races

References

External links
 Racing and Sports Group Race Interactive database
 International Cataloguing Standards Committee

Horse racing terminology
Horse races in Australia